The Raging Dragons are a dragon boat club based in London, UK. The club trains on the Royal Albert Dock at the London Regatta Centre.

The club competes in the Premier and Standard League of the BDA, with Open, Mixed, and Ladies crews.
The team has a number of members who currently paddle for the Great Britain national Dragon Boat team, the most notable of which are Victor Martinez (ex-footballer) and Richard Wang. Celebrity Gok Wan has paddled with Raging Dragons and the team featured in episode 4 of his Gok Cooks Chinese TV show on Channel 4. In 2012, the Raging Dragons were selected to paddle in the man-powered section of the flotilla in the Thames Diamond Jubilee Pageant. In 2012, the Raging Dragons supported the formation of Wave Walkers, London's first dragon boat team of cancer survivors.

History 
The club was formed in 2002, based at the Docklands Sailing and Watersports Centre in Millwall dock. It originally was a charity crew called "Chinese Professionals".

It was later branded as "Dragonflies". In 2006, they became a member of the BDA (British Dragon Boat Racing Association), as a sister team to Thames Dragons, leading to their third branding as the "Thames Raging Dragons". In 2008, the "Thames Raging Dragons" gained promotion to the Premier League, and the following year they broke away from Thames Dragons under the sponsorship of Sun Lik Beer. In 2010, the Raging Dragons took a "notable second place in the premier 200m league,"  surpassing former sister team Thames Dragons to become the highest placed team in London.

References

External links
 Raging Dragons
 Thames Dragons
 BDA - British Dragon Boat Racing Association
 London Regatta Centre
 Sun Lik Beer

Dragon boat racing
Clubs and societies in London
Water sports in London